Tsugumichi is a masculine Japanese given name.

Possible writings
Tsugumichi can be written using different combinations of kanji characters. Here are some examples:

次道, "next, way"
次路, "next, route"
次通, "next, pass through"
嗣道, "succession, way"
嗣路, "succession, route"
嗣通, "succession, pass through"
継道, "continue, way"
継路, "continue, route"
継通, "continue, pass through"
従道, "comply, way"
承叙, "receive, relate"

The name can also be written in hiragana つぐみち or katakana ツグミチ.

Notable people with the name
Tsugumichi Suzuki (鈴木 従道, born 1945), Japanese long-distance runner.
Tsugumichi Tsugaru (津軽 承叙, 1840–1903), Japanese daimyō.
Tsugumichi Saigo (西郷 従道, 1843–1902), Japanese politician and admiral in the Meiji period.

Japanese masculine given names